Sonada is a census town in the Jorebunglow Sukhiapokhri CD block in the Darjeeling Sadar subdivision of the Darjeeling District in West Bengal, India.

Geography

Area overview
The map alongside shows a part of the southern portion of the Darjeeling Himalayan hill region  in the Darjeeling district. In the Darjeeling Sadar subdivision 61.00% of the total population lives in the rural areas and 39.00% of the population lives in the urban areas. In the Mirik subdivision 80.11% of the total population lives in the rural areas and 19.89% lives in the urban areas. There are 78 tea gardens/ estates (the figure varies slightly according to different sources), in the district, producing and largely exporting Darjeeling tea. It engages a large proportion of the population directly/ indirectly. Some tea gardens were identified in the 2011 census as census towns or villages. Such places are marked in the map as CT (census town) or R (rural/ urban centre). Specific tea estate pages are marked TE.

Note: The map alongside presents some of the notable locations in the subdivision. All places marked in the map are linked in the larger full screen map.

Location

It is 17 km from Darjeeling town and 16 km from Kurseong. Mirik is 23 km away, Ghoom 8 km, Mangpu 8 km and Takdah 11 km. It lies on National Highway 55 connecting Darjeeling with Siliguri.  Sonada Monastery, Tiger Hill, Chatakpur, Goreto Nalichour, Intek Ceder's and Senchal Lake are some places of interest near Sonada. The Darjeeling Himalayan Railway (Toy Train) passes through this town and there is a DHR railway station here.

There are several Tea Estate located in Sonada Valley: Oaks, Rungmook, Ceder's, Milling, Moondakotee, Ringtong, Balasun, Margaret's Hope, Kalej Valley. Balason River is best place for fishing where fish like trout is found in this region. Chatakpur Eco Village, 6 km uphill from the town is a very beautiful place attracting many tourists from where sunrise can be seen.

Demographics
According to the 2011 Census of India, Sonada Khasmahal had a total population of 11.635 of which 5,793 (50%) were males and 5,842 (50%) were females. There were 861 persons in the age range of 0 to 6 years. The total number of literate people in Sonada Khasmahal was 9,482 (81.50% of the population over 6 years).

Infrastructure
According to the District Census Handbook 2011, Darjiling, Sonada Khasmahal covered an area of 5.8073 km2. Among the civic amenities, it had 3 km of roads, the protected water supply involved overhead tank, spring and tap water from untreated sources. It had 2,075 domestic electric connections. Among the medical facilities, it had 1 dispensary/ health centre, 1 veterinary hospital and 4 medicine shops. Among the educational facilities it had were 11 primary schools, 4 middle schools, 4 secondary schools, 2 senior secondary schools, 1 degree college. It had 5 shorthand, typewriting and vocational training institutes, 5 non-formal education centres (Sarva Siksha Abhiyan) and 1 special school for the disabled. Among the social, recreational and cultural facilities it had 1 orphanage home. It had the offices of 2 non-agricultural credit centres.

Education

Salesian College was established at Sonada in 1933. Affiliated with the University of North Bengal it offers honours courses in English, education, history, geography, mass communication & journalism, political science, psychology, sociology, accountancy, finance, management, computer science and mathematics, and general courses in arts, science and commerce.

Sonada Degree College was established at Sonada in 1985. Affiliated with the University of North Bengal it offers honours courses in Nepali,  English, history, political science and a general course in arts.

References

Cities and towns in Darjeeling district